Zhou Qiurui (Chinese: 周秋瑞; September 29, 1967) is a former female Chinese gymnast.  Zhou competed at 1984 Olympic Games and won a bronze medal in Women's Team competition. She qualified to the floor finals where she placed 4th. 

At the 2020 Olympic Games, she served as floor exercise supervisor for women's events.

References

1967 births
Living people
Chinese female artistic gymnasts
Olympic bronze medalists for China
Olympic medalists in gymnastics
Medalists at the 1984 Summer Olympics
Olympic gymnasts of China
Gymnasts at the 1984 Summer Olympics